The Power Within is the fifth full-length album by the English power metal band DragonForce, released in April 2012. It is the first DragonForce album to feature vocalist Marc Hudson. "Cry Thunder" was released as downloadable content for Rock Band 3.

DragonForce announced a complete remix and remaster of the album in April 2018 titled Re-Powered Within which was released on 4 May 2018.

Overview 
DragonForce revealed details about the album on their Facebook page on 2 February 2012 and later on the official website. They released the album cover, track listing, and release date and also announced four different editions that would be released: CD, digital download, LP and a limited edition box set.  As of September 2014 the album is unavailable for digital download with no explanation given by any member of the band.

Herman Li stated:

"The last two years have been the most fun we ever had making an album. Through writing, jamming and touring together, we have built this incredible energy and it has been fully captured on the new album. This time around we've really brought our metal-side to the surface and made some of the best music of our career. From the fastest song we've ever recorded to the slower songs, and some things you would never expect from us, this is by far the most diverse DragonForce album yet. This is an exciting new era for DragonForce with Marc joining the band-- so we figured this was an ideal time to take full control of our own destiny and establish our own record label for Europe. It's all hands on deck running it, but a great buzz!"

The Power Within also marks a turning point for DragonForce lyrics: being less related to fantasy and exploring other subjects.

"Fallen World" was streamed for free on Metal Hammer'''s website on 18 February 2012. The song later became a free downloadable track on 8 March 2012.NORTH AMERICA TOUR DATES + FREE DOWNLOAD + PRE-ORDER AVAILABLE NOW blog on DragonForce's site. Retrieved on 16 March 2012 At 220 beats per minute (bpm) it was the fastest song ever released by DragonForce and it held this title until 18 August 2014 when the band's sixth album Maximum Overload was released with the track "The Game" which is even faster (240 bpm).

"Cry Thunder" was streamed for free on RCRDLBL's website via SoundCloud on 30 March 2012 by the band's North American label Roadrunner Records. However, the download function of SoundCloud was disabled.

The music video for "Cry Thunder" was released on DragonForce's YouTube account on 29 March 2012 and was shown on www.noisecreep.com and made available to download via iTunes on 3 April 2012.

A music video for the song "Seasons" was released on 14 September 2012. It featured scenes from the album recording, live and backstage performances and behind the scenes footage of the "Cry Thunder" video shoot.

 Reception The Power Within has received positive reviews. At Metacritic (which assigns a normalised rating out of 100 to reviews from mainstream critics)  the album received an average score of 74, based on 5 reviews. It sold 5,800 copies in the United States in its first week of release to debut at No. 74 on the Billboard 200 albums chart. Their previous album Ultra Beatdown'' opened at No. 18 with first week sales of 24,000 back in September 2008.

Track listing

Original release

Notes
"Power of the Ninja Sword" is a re-recording of a song recorded by Totman and ZP Theart under the name Shadow Warriors.

2018 remixed and remastered release (Re-Powered Within)

Personnel

DragonForce 
 Marc Hudson – lead and backing vocals
 Herman Li – guitars, backing vocals, production, engineering
 Sam Totman – guitars, harsh vocals, backing vocals, production
 Vadim Pruzhanov – keyboards, piano, backing vocals
 Dave Mackintosh – drums, backing vocals
 Frédéric Leclercq – bass guitar, guitars, harsh vocals, backing vocals, guitar solos on "Give Me the Night", "Wings of Liberty" and "Seasons", acoustic guitar and bass on "Seasons (Acoustic Version)", production

Additional musicians 
 Emily Ovenden, Clive Nolan – backing vocals

Production 
 Karl Groom – engineering, mixing with DragonForce
 Peter van't Riet – mastering
 Damien Rainaud – remixing, remastering (2018)

Charts

References 

2012 albums
DragonForce albums
Roadrunner Records albums